The Comburg (also Grosscomburg) is a former Benedictine monastery near Schwäbisch Hall, Germany.

History
In 1078, Burkhardt II, donated his family's ancestral castle, on a hill overlooking the Kocher river and the town of Schwäbisch Hall, to the Benedictine Order for the establishment of an abbey and joined the order. The Counts of Rothenburg-Comburg, who also owned Hall and its salt flats, became the vögte of the abbey until their family became extinct in the early 12th century. Their possessions were inherited by the House of Hohenstaufen, remained the protectors of the monastery until it transferred authority over the Comburg to the now Free Imperial City of Schwäbisch Hall in 1348.

Not long after its founding, the Comburg became associated with Hirsau Abbey and in 1086 integrated the Hirsau Reforms. As a result, it received several portions of donated land from which it began to flourish. Under its third abbot, Hertwig of Hirsau, the Comburg reached the apex of its fortunes in the early 13th century, operating a scriptorium and possibly a metal foundry on its grounds. In the 14th century, however, the Comburg faced economic downturn and began to borrow money, occasionally being obliged to pledge its treasures as collateral.

From the beginning of the 14th century, the monks of the Comburg came from the gentry of Schwäbisch Hall and from the mid-15th century Franconian noble families. The Bishop of Würzburg assumed temporal responsibility for the Comburg in 1485 and, three years later, transformed the Comburg into a collegiate church that would only admit nobles. This close connection with Würzburg allowed the Comburg to survive the Reformation and retain its properties. The monks of the Comburg also maintained close ties to Ellwangen Abbey.

Secularization
As a part of the Napoleonic during the process of German mediatization, the Comburg and its estates were divided between the Electorate of Württemberg and the Electorate of Bavaria in 1802. Württemberg was awarded almost all of Comburg's remaining properties and the Comburg itself, which was subsequently secularized. Frederick I, Elector of Württemberg, ordered the monastery's treasure to be melted down at the royal mint in Ludwigsburg. The monastery's library was moved to the State Library in Stuttgart. From 1807 to 1810, the Comburg was the residence of Prince Paul of Württemberg and Princess Charlotte of Saxe-Hildburghausen as exiles from the court in Stuttgart for their opposition to Frederick's alliance with Napoleon.

The Corps remained at the Comburg until it was made redundant by military pension legislation in 1871, though it was not officially dissolved until 1909. By then, four invalids still resided at the Comburg, the last of whom died in 1925.

Grounds and architecture
The Comburg monastic complex is perched on a hill just outside Schwäbisch Hall. At the top of the hill, forming the center of the complex, is the  the cloister attached to its west end, which are surrounded by dormitories.

The ring wall enclosing the Comburg were built from 1560 to 1570. These were constructed on the order of the provost . The complex has a total of three gates on the path to the Church of St. Nicholas. The third, built in 1100, leads to a chapel dedicated to Michael the Archangel on its upper floor.

Church of St. Nicholas

The original abbey church, a two-story tall Romanesque basilica, was built from 1078 to 1088, when it was consecrated by Adalbero, Bishop of Würzburg. Archaeological examination shows that the nave of this church measured  and revealed a crypt under the east choir, where Count Burkhardt's tomb is located.

With the exception of its three towers, in 1706 the Romanesque tower was demolished to be replaced with a new, Baroque church designed by the architect . The new church was constructed from 1707 to 1715, when it was consecrated, by artisans from Würzburg. The retained towers survived unmodified because their remodeling exceeded the budget allotted to Greissing. The pillars are of masonry, cruciform in shape and decorated with pilasters on all four sides and topped with Classically-inspired entablatures. The church was decorated by sculptor , who created its chapels, pulpit, choir stalls, and organ case. The pulpit is decorated with an image of Christ throwing lightning bolts at the seven sins personified as beautiful women.

The church also contains two medieval metal works, created between the years 1130 and 1140 and possibly within the Comburg. Embossed into the copper are images of the Twelve Apostles, six on either side of Jesus Christ, seated in a mandorla and surrounded by the symbols of the Four Evangelists. Each image is framed by cloisonné bands and gemstones. The antependium was restored in 1969. The second is a wheel chandelier,  in diameter, and made up by twelve gilded copper plates mounted unto two iron rings. The chandelier has four candle holders and twelve towers per plate, which altogether have 412 images on them and an inscription in Latin describing the chandelier.

Abbots 

 Hemmo
 Gunter 1096
 Hardwig
 Adelbert 1145
 Gernod 1158†
 Engelhard Löw
 Wernherr
 Rüdiger
 Wolframus
 Walther 1213†
 Conrad von Entensee
 Heinrich
 Eberhard Philipp von Eltershofen 1213
 Embricus
 Heinrich von Schefflai 1241
 Berchtoldus von Michelfeld
 Sifrid von Morstein 1260
 Heinrich von Presingen
 Burkhardt/Beringer Senft
 Conrad von Ahaussen 1273
 Wolframus von Pühlerriet
 Conrad von Münken 1324
 Heinrich Sieder 1370†
 Rudolph von Gundelshofen 1377†
 Erkhinger Feldner 1401†
 Ehrenfried I von Bellberg 1418†
 Gottfried von Stetten 1451†
 Ehrenfried II von Bellberg 1476†
 Andreas von Triefshausen
 Hiltebrand von Crailsheim
December 5th, 1488 converted to Ritterstift

Citations

References

Online sources

Further reading
 1865. Zeitschrift des Historichen Vereins für das Wirtembergische Franken. Vol 7 Issue 1. Weinsberg. p. 100.
 Hause, Eberhard, 1981. Die Komburgen: ihre Bauwerke, Baumeister und Bauherren. Weinsberg.
 Jooß, Rainer, 1987. Kloster Komburg im Mittelalter. Studien zur Verfassungs-, Besitz- und Sozialgeschichte einer fränkischen Benediktinerabtei (Forschungen aus Württembergisch Franken; Bd. 4), 2nd ed.  Sigmaringen. 
 Kleiber, Gabriele, 1999. Groß- und Kleincomburg. Berlin: Staatliche Schlösser und Gärten Baden-Württemberg in Zusammenarbeit mit der Staatsanzeiger für Baden-Württemberg GmbH. 
 Schraut, Elisabeth (ed.), 1989. Die Comburg: Vom Mittelalter bis ins 20. Jahrhundert. Ausstellung im Hällisch-Fränkischen Museum und auf der Comburg, Neue Dekanei, 13. Juli bis 5. November 1989 (Catalogue of the Hällisch-Fränkisch Museum, Schwäbisch Hall; Bd. 3), Sigmaringen.

External links 

 Archives of the Comburg in the State Archive of Ludwigsburg

Monasteries in Baden-Württemberg
Benedictine monasteries in Germany
1070s establishments in the Holy Roman Empire
1803 disestablishments in the Holy Roman Empire
Christian monasteries established in the 11th century
Schwäbisch Hall